Postcards are pieces of thick paper or thin cardboard.

Postcards may also refer to:

 Postcards (memorial), a 9/11 memorial on Staten Island, New York, US
 Postcards (novel), a novel by E. Annie Proulx
 Postcards (TV series), an Australian magazine TV series
 Postcards Records, an American jazz record label active during the 1990s

Music
 Postcards (Cindy Morgan album)
 Postcards (Peter Ostroushko album)
 Postcards (Sparkadia album)
 Postcards, an album by Tom Landa and the Paperboys
 "Postcards", a song by The Blizzards from Domino Effect
  "Postcards", a song by Faithless from Sunday 8PM
 "Postcards" (James Blunt song), a song from  Moon Landing
 Postcards (band), an indie folk band from Beirut, Lebanon

See also
 Postcard (disambiguation)